Potemnemus is a genus of longhorn beetles of the subfamily Lamiinae, containing the following species:

 Potemnemus ennevei de Jong, 1945
 Potemnemus kaszabi (Breuning, 1973)
 Potemnemus lima Pascoe, 1866
 Potemnemus nylanderi Wallin & Kvamme, 2015
 Potemnemus pristis Pascoe, 1866
 Potemnemus rosenbergii Vollenhoven, 1871
 Potemnemus sepicanus Kriesche, 1923 [= hispidus]
 Potemnemus scabrosus (Olivier, 1790) [= loriai, trituberculatus]
 Potemnemus thomsoni Lansberge, 1880
 Potemnemus trimaculatus Lea, 1918 [= detzneri]
 Potemnemus tuberifer Gahan, 1894
 Potemnemus wheatcrofti (Breuning, 1971)
 Potemnemus wolfi Berchmans, 1925

References

Lamiini